István Sándor Fülöp (born 18 May 1990) is a Romanian professional footballer who plays as a midfielder for Gloria Buzău.

Club career
He made his debut on the professional league level in the Liga I for Botoșani on 21 July 2013 as a starter in a game against CFR Cluj.

Diósgyőr
On 23 December 2016, Fülöp was signed by Nemzeti Bajnokság I club Diósgyőri VTK.

International career 
He was member of the Székely Land squad that finished 4th at the 2018 ConIFA World Football Cup.

Personal life 
Born in Târgu Mureș, Fülöp is of Hungarian ethnicity. His brother, Lóránd Fülöp is also a footballer.

Career statistics

Club

Honours

Club 
Botoșani
Liga II: 2012–13
Sepsi OSK 
Cupa României: 2021–22

References

External links
 
 
 

Living people
Sportspeople from Târgu Mureș
Romanian people of Hungarian descent
Romanian sportspeople of Hungarian descent
1990 births
Romanian footballers
Association football forwards
FC Botoșani players
Sepsi OSK Sfântu Gheorghe players
Diósgyőri VTK players
Békéscsaba 1912 Előre footballers
FC Gloria Buzău players
Liga I players
Nemzeti Bajnokság I players
Nemzeti Bajnokság II players
Romanian expatriate footballers
Expatriate footballers in Hungary
Romanian expatriate sportspeople in Hungary